Amee Harshadray Yajnik is an Indian National Congress politician from the state of Gujarat. On 15 March 2018 she was elected unopposed to the Rajya Sabha from Gujarat.

References 

Living people
Indian National Congress politicians
Gujarat politicians
Women in Gujarat politics
Women members of the Rajya Sabha
Indian National Congress politicians from Gujarat
1959 births